The Bland Creek, a mostlyperennial river that is part of the Lachlan sub-catchment of the Murrumbidgee catchment within the Murray–Darling basin, is located in the South West Slopes, and Riverina regions of New South Wales, Australia. The Bland Creek is only connected to the Murray Darling basin when both the Lachlan and Murrumbidgee Rivers are in flood.

Course and features 
The Bland Creek (technically a river) rises below Twins Range, a northern spur of the Great Dividing Range, and flows generally north northwest, joined by seven minor tributaries, before reaching its mouth and spilling into Lake Cowal, the largest natural inland lake in New South Wales. The creek descends  over its  course.

Eucalyptus camaldulensis (River Red Gum) woodland occurs along the edges of the Bland Creek. In 2012 it was reported that the Bland Creek mallee fowl was on the brink of extinction.

See also 

 List of rivers of New South Wales (A-K)
 Rivers of New South Wales

References

External links
 
  

Tributaries of the Lachlan River
Rivers of New South Wales
Rivers in the Riverina